A bid manager is an executive sales role within an organization, responsible for managing bids generally in response to request for proposals (RFPs) from customers, but also as proactive pursuits for business. Bid managers orchestrate the creation of the solution and proposal as ‘Bid Project Managers’ ensuring compliance with customer requirements while highlighting company value proposition. The role of a bid manager often works with company board directors and C-level management (i.e. CEO, CFO) to bring and deliver strategic approaches to win bids.

Bid management

Bid managers are responsible for the proposal of bids to existing or prospective clients for projects. A bid manager will ensure the smooth running of the bid for a project within the correct time and financial parameters, and manage the relationship with the client. 

Bid managers may work in conjunction with a bid director and often with specialists in the construction and built environment industries to create and manage the bid for a project.

A bid manager's role varies based on the industry and how the individual company has structured their management of sales cycle. A company that depends on short (quick win) sales cycle often relies on proposal managers, where as organisations that depends on longer term, complex sales processes depends on bid managers. In addition to managing bids, bid managers work closely with company board directors and C-level management to set the strategic direction of the business by providing insight into market trends through direct exposure to critical feedback from failed bids and the evolving needs of clients.

Bid managers' salaries differ across the construction industry depending on the company and, moreover, the specific project. According to a survey conducted in 2010 the average salary of a bid manager in the UK construction industry, including a bonus, is £120,250 per annum. Certain projects are more financially beneficial depending on the nature of the project or sector. For example, bid managers working on private projects earn an average salary of £80,000, whilst public sector projects make a lower figure of £40,000. However, bonuses can be accumulated at a rate of at least 20–60% of the salary. For example, a salary of £50,000 can be given and depending on performance, a 60% bonus will be given on top of the salary, bringing the total earnings to £70,000 or more.

Bid managers and their role in outsourcing

Bid managers play an important role in outsourcing, where they produce and manage bids for companies structured to take on outsourcing projects from the government and industries. These bids run anywhere between three and 18 months (on average about six months), involve substantial bid budgets (as much as $5 million for very large bids over $100 million in value) and large teams of between 10 and 100 people. The bid manager ensures that all customer-specified milestones are met and all deliverables of the bid are produced as specified. A bid manager's performance is normally evaluated based on the percentage of contracts he or she wins. Bid managers typically work with teams collected together from line functions for the temporary duration of the bid project, and hence need to have strong leadership skills to manage bids successfully. Good bid managers are in strong demand in the outsourcing industry.

References

Procurement
Management occupations
Managers